Rachel Elizabeth Zuckert (born January 6, 1969) is an American philosopher and associate professor of philosophy at the Northwestern University. 
She is known for her expertise on Kantian philosophy.
Zuckert is a former president of North American Kant Society.

Books
 Kant on Beauty and Biology:  An Interpretation of the Critique of Judgment, Cambridge University Press, 2007.
 Herder's Naturalist Aesthetics, Cambridge University Press, 2019.

References

External links
 Rachel Elizabeth Zuckert at Northwestern University
Rachel Zuckert - Herder's Naturalism on Vimeo

1969 births
21st-century American philosophers
Philosophy academics
University of Chicago alumni
Northwestern University faculty
Living people
Kant scholars
Heidegger scholars
American women philosophers
Fellows of the National Endowment for the Humanities
21st-century American women